Urzage was an ancient Iraqi ruler. He ruled sometime during the Early Dynastic IIIb period; additionally, temp. A'annepada, Entemena, Il, and Ishtup-Ishar. Urzage was preceded by Lugalsilâsi I as the king of Uruk. Urzage may have also been succeeded by Lugalkinishedudu as a great king of Kish.

References

Notes

Citations

Sources

Bibliography

External links

25th-century BC Sumerian kings
Kings of Kish